Municipality of Baviácora is a municipality ('county') in Sonora in northwestern Mexico.

County seat
The town of Baviácora is the county seat.

References

Municipalities of Sonora